is a Japanese multimedia franchise by Pony Canyon and Comptiq. It features character designs and illustrations by artist Tsubasu Izumi, series composition and story by Team Yoree (Yoriko Tomita, Yasuko Kamo and Tatsuhiko Urahata), and music by Kohta Yamamoto. The story revolves around female junior high school idols who aim to become a top in Prism Stage, a nationwide tournament where many middle school idols compete and become top idols. These girls are divided into several units. Their stories are serialized in monthly Comptiq and short stories are released online via the official website.

A light novel series and several unit singles has been released. A mobile rhythm game developed by Hotarubi titled  was released on July 31, 2017 for Android and August 5, 2017 for iOS. An anime television series titled  by Yumeta Company and Graphinica aired from July 7 to September 29, 2019.

Cast

KiRaRe

Amane Makino as 
Akari Kitō as 
Masumi Tazawa as 
Meemu Tachibana as 
Yuka Iwahashi as 
Yuki Sorami as /

Ortensia

Ari Ozawa as 
Yumiri Hanamori/Tomomi Mineuchi as

Stellamaris

Minami Takahashi as 
Ayaka Suwa as 
Aimi Tanaka as

Trois Anges

Natsumi Hioka as 
Rika Abe as 
Juri Nagatsuma as

Tetrarkhia

Natsumi Yamada as 
Miki Satō as 
Tomoyo Takayanagi as 
Nozomi Nishida as

Discography

Singles

Albums

Media

Light novel
Three light novel voluems written by Team Yoree (Yoriko Tomita, Yasuko Kamo and Tatsuhiko Urahata) and illustrated by Tsubasu Izumi, Marehosi Gakuen Takao School Art Club and Matsuda98 was released on March 10, 2016 by Kadokawa Shoten.

Video games
A mobile rhythm game developed by Hotarubi titled  was released on July 31, 2017 for Android and August 5, 2017 for iOS. In addition, in Sega's arcade music game Ongeki (Summer Plus and R.E.D.), the characters and songs of Re:Stage! will appear as a collaboration in 2020 and 2021.

Collaborations
Re: Stage! Prism Step has collaborated with the following works in the past.

 Yuruyuri in 2018
 Lucky Star in 2018
 Ongeki
 Ongeki Summer Plus in 2020
 Ongeki R.E.D. in 2021
 The Demon Girl Next Door in 2020
 Battle Athletes Victory ReSTART! in 2021
  Dropout Idol Fruit Tart in 2021

Anime
An anime adaptation was announced on July 1, 2018 during the annual live event at Yamano Hall, titled . The series is animated by Yumeta Company and Graphinica, and aired from July 7 to September 29, 2019 on Tokyo MX and BS Fuji. The series is directed by Shin Katagai, with Team Yoree handling series composition, Motohiro Taniguchi designing the characters based upon Tsubasu Izumi's character designs, and Kohta Yamamoto composing the music. The series ran for 12 episodes. The idol group KiRaRe performed the series' opening theme song "Don't think, Smile!!", as well as the series' ending theme song "Akogare Future Sign". Sentai Filmworks has licensed the series.

Episode list

Notes

References

External links
Official website 
Game official website 
Anime official website 

2017 video games
2019 anime television series debuts
Android (operating system) games
Graphinica
IOS games
Japanese girl groups
Japanese idol groups
Japanese idols in anime and manga
Music video games
Pony Canyon
Pony Canyon artists
Sentai Filmworks
Yumeta Company